The siege of Busanjin was a battle fought at Busan on 24 May 1592, between Japanese and Korean forces. The attacks on Busan and the neighboring fort of Dadaejin were the first battles of the Japanese invasions of Korea (1592–98).

Background
The Japanese invasion force consisting of 400 transports bearing 18,700 men under the command of Konishi Yukinaga departed from Tsushima Island on 23 May and arrived at Busan harbor without any incident. The commander of Busan, Jeong Bal, spotted the invasion fleet while hunting on Yeong Island off Busan Harbor and rushed back to Busan to prepare defenses. A single vessel bearing the daimyō of Tsushima Sō Yoshitoshi (who had been a member of the Japanese mission to Korea in 1589) detached from the Japanese fleet with a letter to the commander of Busan, Jeong Bal, demanding that the Korean forces stand down to allow the Japanese armies to proceed on towards China. The letter went unanswered, and the Japanese commenced landing operations from 0400 the following morning. 

The Joseon fleet of 150 ships did nothing and sat idle at port while Gyeongsang Left Navy Commander Bak Hong reported to Gyeongsang Right Navy Commander Won Gyun, who thought the invasion might have been a really large trade mission.

The commanders of the Japanese forces were Konishi, Sō,  Matsura Shigenobu, Arima Harunobu, Ōmura Yoshiaki and Gotō Mototsugu, all of whom (with the exception of Matsura) were Kirishitans, as were many of their men. A portion of this force led by Konishi attacked a nearby fort called Dadaejin, while Sō led the main contingent against Busan.

Battle
Early in the morning of May 24, 1592, Sō Yoshitoshi once again called up Joeng Bal to stand down, assuring that he and his men would be safe if they would stand aside and allow the Japanese to pass. Joeng refused, stating that he was duty bound to oppose the Japanese advance unless he received orders from Seoul to do otherwise, and the Japanese attack then commenced.  The Japanese tried to take the south gate of Busan Castle first but took heavy casualties and were forced to switch to the north gate. The Japanese took high ground positions on the mountain behind Busan and shot at Korean defenders within the city with their arquebuss until they created a breach in their northern defenses. The Koreans, armed primarily with bows and spears, were outranged by Japanese firepower, and soon ran out of arrows. Commander Jeong Bal was struck by a bullet and died at around nine AM, causing morale to collapse and the swift fall of the city.

Aftermath
Once within the walls of the fortification, the Japanese massacred thousands. "Both men, women, and even dogs and cats were beheaded." According to Japanese records, 8500 Koreans were killed in at Busan and 200 were taken prisoner. 

Gyeongsang Left Navy Commander Bak Hong watched the fall of Busan from a distance. He then scuttled his fleet of 100 ships, which included more than 50 warships armed with cannon, and destroyed his weapons and provisions, so that they would not fall into Japanese hands. Abandoning his men, he fled to Hanseong.

The following day, Konishi recombined his forces, and then advanced towards the fortress of Dongnae located ten kilometers northeast on the main road to Seoul.

Legacy
With the port in Japanese hands, the area became the primary landing ground for subsequent Japanese deployments to Korea during the Japanese invasion, notably the large army led by Kato Kiyomasa and the slightly smaller army led by Kuroda Nagamasa. It was also the primary Japanese supply base throughout the conflict.

To commemorate the battle, there is a statue of Jeong Bal next to the Japanese Consulate in Busan.

See also 
 Castles in Korea

Citations

Bibliography

 
 
 
 
 
 
 
 
 
 
 桑田忠親 [Kuwata, Tadachika], ed., 舊參謀本部編纂, [Kyu Sanbo Honbu], 朝鮮の役 [Chousen no Eki]　(日本の戰史 [Nihon no Senshi] Vol. 5), 1965.

External links
Chungnyeolsa Shrine

1592 in Asia
1592 in Japan
Busan
Busanjin
Busan
Busan
Conflicts in 1592